Maurice Pluntke (born 23 January 1994) is a German footballer who plays for as a centre-back or defensive midfielder for Wegberg-Beeck.

Career
Pluntke began his career at SC Rheindahlen and joined the youth team at Borussia Mönchengladbach in 2002. He went through all youth teams and promoted to the reserve team for the 2013–14 season. On 17 May 2014, he made his debut in a 2–2 draw against Sportfreunde Lotte in Regionalliga West.

Pluntke moved to Fortuna Düsseldorf for the 2014–15 season, whose second team also played in the Regionalliga West. On 25 April 2015, he was in the first team's squad for the first time in a league game against 1860 Munich. On 8 May 2015, he made his debut in the 2–0 defeat in a home game against VfR Aalen in the 2. Bundesliga.

In mid-January 2016, Pluntke terminated his contract in Düsseldorf, and joined American third-tier side Orange County SC in Irvine, California in April 2016.

In mid-January 2017 Pluntke returned to Germany and joined the Regionalliga team Alemannia Aachen. For the 2018–19 season he moved to FSV Wacker 90 Nordhausen. Pluntke joined Kickers Offenbach in January 2020, signing a deal until June 2021.

References

External links
 
 
 

1994 births
Living people
Sportspeople from Mönchengladbach
German footballers
Footballers from North Rhine-Westphalia
Association football defenders
Association football midfielders
2. Bundesliga players
Regionalliga players
USL Championship players
Oberliga (football) players
Borussia Mönchengladbach players
Fortuna Düsseldorf players
Orange County SC players
Alemannia Aachen players
FSV Wacker 90 Nordhausen players
Kickers Offenbach players
1. FC Bocholt players
FC Wegberg-Beeck players
German expatriate footballers
German expatriate sportspeople in the United States
Expatriate soccer players in the United States